The Woodville Lacrosse Club was founded in 1899 and is located in the north western suburbs of Adelaide.

In 1903, the name of the club was changed to Port Adelaide, by which it was known until 1966, until becoming once again known as Woodville.

Premierships 
As Port Adelaide, the Club had early success in 1904, finishing the season ahead of Sturt, who were the dominant club in South Australia at the time. Port Adelaide had additional success in 1931 and 1932, before having a golden era in the 1950s, featuring in 10 of 12 grand finals and winning four of them. There was a 39-year drought before success returned to the Club, this time as Woodville, with 8 premierships in 11 years including five in a row from 1998 to 2002.

A Grade Premierships:
 1904, 1931, 1932, 1949, 1955, 1958, 1959, 1998, 1999, 2000, 2001, 2002, 2005, 2007, 2008

National Awards 
Australian Lacrosse Council (now ALA) Fellows Award:
 1995 – Kenneth Forrest

O C Isaachsen Trophy winners:
 1967 – Glenn Bowyer
 2002 – Peter Inge
 2004, 2006 – James Inge

Shelley Maher Trophy winners:
 2021 – Olivia Parker

Brady Award (Best and Fairest at the National Carnival):
 1959 – Ralph Turner
 1998 – Aaron Sargent
 2005 – Peter Inge
 2010 – Stefan Guerin

Australian Club Champions
 2008

Notable players 
One of Woodville's finest players is Peter Inge, who represented Australia in World Championships in 1998, 2002 and 2006 as well as the national Under 19 team in 1996. At the 2002 World Lacrosse Championship, Inge was named in the All-Star Team. In 2003, Inge became the first Australian and first player without NCAA experience to be drafted to the professional Major League Lacrosse competition in the United States, where he was selected for the Boston Cannons. He played at Boston for three years before spending his fourth and final year in the MLL at the now-defunct San Francisco Dragons.

See also 

 Lacrosse in Australia
 List of South Australian Lacrosse Premiers
 List of the oldest lacrosse teams

Notes

External links
 

Lacrosse teams in Australia
Sporting clubs in Adelaide
1899 establishments in Australia
Lacrosse clubs established in 1899